The 2014 season was the Minnesota Vikings' 54th in the National Football League and their first under head coach Mike Zimmer. It was the first of two seasons in which the Vikings played at the outdoor TCF Bank Stadium on the campus of the University of Minnesota. Construction of U.S. Bank Stadium began on the site of the team's former home, the Hubert H. Humphrey Metrodome, with a target of opening for the 2016 season.

Though the Vikings were eliminated from postseason contention after a loss to the Detroit Lions in Week 15, they improved on 2013's 5–10–1 record, which saw them go through a quarterback carousel and one of the worst defenses in the league that year, and arguably in Vikings' history.

Offseason

Draft

Draft trades

Roster changes

 Denotes this is a reserve/future contract.
Denotes a signing to the Practice Squad.

Preseason

Schedule

Game summaries

Week 1: vs. Oakland Raiders
 
Coming off a season in which the Vikings let almost every team score at least 20 points on them (including the preseason), the Vikings showcased a defense that held the Raiders to a single digit score and kept them scoreless until the last 90 seconds of the 4th quarter, when they eventually scored a touchdown. This was the first time the Vikings' defense held any team to a single digit score since week 16 of the 2012 season. Rookie Anthony Barr recorded half a sack, and Kurt Coleman intercepted Raiders quarterback Derek Carr once.

On the offense, Matt Cassel started and shined on his sole drive, leading the team down the field, where Matt Asiata scored the Vikings' only touchdown of the game from a yard out. After Cassel's drive, rookie quarterback Teddy Bridgewater entered the game and played a few drives, completing 6 of 13 pass attempts for 49 yards, getting sacked twice, and fumbling once (fellow Viking Matt Kalil recovered the fumble). The Vikings got a field goal on the second drive. Shortly after the half, the signal calling was turned to Christian Ponder, who managed a pair of first-down passes of 17 and 15 yards early on, but produced little thereafter.

Week 2: vs. Arizona Cardinals

The Vikings faced a Cardinals team that shut the Texans out 32–0 in week 1. The Cardinals strained the Vikings' defense, but the offense, headed by Matt Cassel in the first half, was able to keep pace with their scoring to see the Vikings trailing 14–13 at halftime. The Vikings switched to Teddy Bridgewater after the half, and the rookie quarterback orchestrated a pair of drives that put the Vikings back in the lead 24–21. A few drives later, the Vikings' defense would end up being penalized three straight times, allowing the Cardinals to score a touchdown through a botched snap that was recovered by the Cardinals and run into the end zone. The Vikings were given the ball with around a minute to score. Bridgewater led the Vikings down field in comeback fashion to score the game-winner with a pass to Rodney Smith, sealing another preseason victory for the Vikings.

Week 3: at Kansas City Chiefs

The Vikings traveled to Kansas City to play against Matt Cassel's former team. The defense played remarkably well, with Captain Munnerlyn, Chad Greenway and Shaun Prater each recording an interception. The Vikings' defense managed to hold the Chiefs to five points for a majority of the game until they got a touchdown in the final minute for a total of 12. For the third game running, Cassel was the starting quarterback and he played the majority of this game; he gained 152 passing yards with a touchdown pass to Cordarrelle Patterson, and threw a pick, the Vikings' only turnover of their preseason. Bridgewater also saw a little action; though he made few pass attempts, he gained 40 passing yards and made two touchdown passes to Allen Reisner.

Week 4: at Tennessee Titans

The Vikings traveled to Tennessee to face the Titans in the preseason finale. The Vikings' defense excelled in keeping the Titans to a minimal score, and recorded a strip sack by Corey Wootton and an interception by Julian Posey. Teddy Bridgewater was the starter for this game, and led the Vikings to score 10 points in their first two drives. Christian Ponder then took over for the rest of the game, leading three more scoring drives, though he and the offense were unable to score any touchdowns.

Regular season

Schedule

Note: Division rivals are marked with bold text.

Game summaries

Week 1: at St. Louis Rams

The Vikings opened their season on the road against the St. Louis Rams and took the lead in the first half with a field goal in each quarter from 52 yards and 46 yards, respectively, from third-year kicker Blair Walsh and an eight-yard touchdown pass from Matt Cassel to Greg Jennings with 21 seconds left in the half, set up by an interception from Josh Robinson at the Rams' 35-yard line. The Rams struck back early in the third quarter with a field goal from Greg Zuerlein before Vikings wide receiver Cordarrelle Patterson made the play of the game with a 67-yard touchdown run. The Vikings secured the game late in the fourth quarter as TE Kyle Rudolph connected with Cassel on a seven-yard touchdown pass, while Rudolph's former Notre Dame teammate Harrison Smith took an interception 81 yards for the Vikings' fourth touchdown of the game. Zuerlein added another field goal late in the game to make the final score 34–6 to the Vikings, their first road victory since week 16 of the 2012 season against the Houston Texans.

Week 2: vs. New England Patriots

The Vikings began their opening home game of the season without Adrian Peterson, who was deactivated after being charged with negligent injury of a child for allegedly beating his four-year-old son with a tree branch. He was replaced in the starting lineup by Matt Asiata, who got the Vikings off to a good start with a 25-yard touchdown reception from Matt Cassel on the game's opening possession. The defense then forced the Patriots into a three-and-out, only for Cassel to throw an interception attempting to find Jarius Wright deep downfield. Devin McCourty returned the ball 60 yards to the Minnesota 1-yard line, and two plays later, Stevan Ridley ran in to tie the scores. A second interception early in the second quarter resulted in another scoring drive for New England, as Tom Brady connected with Julian Edelman on a nine-yard TD catch. As the first half drew to a close, the Vikings drove downfield to give Blair Walsh a 48-yard field goal attempt with 19 seconds on the clock; however, Patriots DE Chandler Jones was able to burst through the Minnesota offensive line and block the kick before scooping up the ball and returning it 58 yards for the Patriots' third TD of the half.

After the break, Cassel threw another two interceptions, one in each quarter, with the first resulting in a 47-yard Stephen Gostkowski field goal. The second occurred with six minutes left in the game, and the Patriots were able to hang onto possession until the two-minute warning before turning the ball over on downs at the Minnesota 19-yard line. Aided by two pass interference penalties, Cassel led the Vikings down the field and thought he had managed to cut into the New England lead with a 16-yard pass to Greg Jennings with 41 seconds to play, only for Jennings to be ruled out of bounds before gaining possession of the ball. Cassel was then sacked for a 14-yard loss on the next play and the game finished as a 30–7 Patriots win.

Week 3: at New Orleans Saints

After initially stating that Adrian Peterson would return to the active roster for their Week 3 game at New Orleans, the Vikings later placed the running back on the inactive list indefinitely, pending the outcome of the court case against him. Despite coming into the game at 0–3, the Saints started well, scoring two touchdowns on their first two drives, although DE Everson Griffen was able to block the extra point attempt on the second. The Vikings responded to going 13–0 down with two field goals from 25 and 30 yards respectively, but an injury to Matt Cassel meant a debut for rookie QB Teddy Bridgewater.

K Blair Walsh hit a 40-yard field goal to open the second half for the Vikings, but New Orleans closed the game out with an 18-yard touchdown pass from Drew Brees to Marques Colston early in the fourth quarter. They were aided on the drive by a penalty for unnecessary roughness against CB Captain Munnerlyn for a tackle on Brees, but many thought that Brees should also have been penalized for his reaction and the penalties offset. Regardless, the Vikings were forced to punt on their next possession and the Saints were able to run out the clock for a 20–9 win.

Week 4: vs. Atlanta Falcons

Having lost Matt Cassel for the season, the Vikings gave Teddy Bridgewater his first career start at home to the Falcons in week 4, but it was running back Matt Asiata who opened the scoring with a 3-yard touchdown run. Roddy White leveled the scores with a 24-yard catch from Matt Ryan, but a 49-yard kickoff return from Cordarrelle Patterson set the Vikings up with a short field on the next drive, which Asiata finished with a 6-yard run to restore Minnesota's seven-point lead. Steven Jackson thought he had tied the scores again on a 3-yard run with six minutes to go in the half, only for the touchdown call to be overturned on review; however, Ryan was able to find FB Patrick DiMarco in the flat on the next play. However, Bridgewater himself restored Minnesota's advantage on the ensuing possession, capping an 80-yard drive with a 13-yard touchdown run as the game entered its first two-minute warning. After forcing Atlanta into a quick three-and-out, Bridgewater led the Vikings downfield to the brink of another touchdown, but a lack of time meant they had to settle for an 18-yard Blair Walsh field goal to give them a 24–14 lead at the half.

Walsh scored another field goal on the opening drive of the second half, but long touchdowns for Devin Hester and Antone Smith gave the Falcons a one-point lead going into the fourth quarter. Those would prove to be Atlanta's last points of the game as Asiata picked up his third TD run early in the fourth quarter, with Bridgewater adding two points with a pass to Rhett Ellison. Bridgewater was injured on that drive, meaning that third-string QB Christian Ponder came in for his first appearance of the season. However, his job was simply to hand the ball off to rookie running back Jerick McKinnon, who set up a 55-yard field goal attempt for Walsh. An interception by Harrison Smith led to another field goal from 33 yards, before Josh Robinson closed the game out with another interception.

Week 5: at Green Bay Packers

With only four days between games, Teddy Bridgewater had insufficient time to recover from the injury he picked up in week 4 and Christian Ponder made his first start since week 12 of the 2013 season. The Vikings defense forced Green Bay to punt on the first possession of the game, but soon kicked the ball back to the Packers, allowing Eddie Lacy's running to set up an 8-yard touchdown pass from Aaron Rodgers to Randall Cobb. The Vikings' ensuing possession again ended with a punt, and Rodgers punished them with a 66-yard TD pass to Jordy Nelson. The teams traded possession as the game moved into the second quarter, until Ponder threw the ball directly to Packers DE Julius Peppers, who returned the interception 49 yards for his team's third TD of the game. Two plays later, Ponder was picked off again, this time by LB Jamari Lattimore, leaving a short field for Rodgers to work into before throwing an 11-yard TD pass to WR Davante Adams.

The second half began in much the same vein, as the Packers forced a Vikings punt on the first possession before marching downfield to set Lacy up for an 11-yard scoring run. The running back went into the end zone again at the end of the Packers' next possession with a 10-yard run, giving the home team a 42–0 lead. CB Marcus Sherels returned the ensuing kickoff 46 yards, and Ponder was able to pass downfield to the Green Bay 6-yard line, from where he ran into the end zone for the Vikings' first points of the game. Three plays later, Harrison Smith picked off a pass from Matt Flynn at the Green Bay 30-yard line, but the Vikings were unable to get into the end zone despite the short field and had to settle for a 26-yard Blair Walsh field goal. As the game drew to a close, the Vikings regained possession and drove down to the Packers' 8-yard line, only to be denied on 4th-and-goal, allowing Green Bay to end the game with a kneeldown.

Week 6: vs. Detroit Lions

Week 7: at Buffalo Bills

Week 8: at Tampa Bay Buccaneers

Week 9: vs. Washington Redskins

With the close win over the Redskins, the Vikings improved to 4–5. Teddy Bridgewater's third win as a starting rookie quarterback breaks the franchise record (two wins) shared by both Fran Tarkenton and Christian Ponder.

Week 10: Bye
The Vikings took their bye week in week 10, along with the Texans, Colts, Patriots, Chargers and Redskins.

Week 11: at Chicago Bears

Week 12: vs. Green Bay Packers

Week 13: vs. Carolina Panthers

Week 14: vs. New York Jets

With the overtime win, the Vikings improve to 6–7 and have therefore improved on last year's record.

Week 15: at Detroit Lions

The loss resulted in the Vikings being officially eliminated from playoff contention.

Week 16: at Miami Dolphins

Week 17: vs. Chicago Bears

Standings

Division

Conference

Roster

Staff

Statistics

Team leaders

Source for this section: Minnesota Vikings' official website.

League rankings

Source for this section: NFL.com.

References

External links
 

Minnesota
Minnesota Vikings seasons
Minnesota Vikings